"She Ain't Gonna Cry" is a song recorded by Canadian country music artist Joel Feeney. It was released in 1999 as the third single from his third studio album, Joel Feeney. It peaked at number 15 on the RPM Country Tracks chart in August 1999.

The song was covered by American country music group Marshall Dyllon and released as a single in 2001. It peaked at number 44 on the Billboard Hot Country Singles & Tracks chart.

Chart performance

Year-end charts

References

1998 songs
1999 singles
2001 singles
Joel Feeney songs
Marshall Dyllon songs
MCA Records singles
Songs written by Joel Feeney
Songs written by Chris Farren (country musician)
Song recordings produced by Chris Farren (country musician)